Partubiola is a genus of minute sea snails or micromolluscs, marine gastropod molluscs in the family Skeneidae.

Species
Species within the genus Partubiola include:
 Partubiola blancha Iredale, 1936

References

 Iredale, T. 1936. Australian molluscan notes. No. 2. Records of the Australian Museum 19(5): 267-340, pls 20-24
 Moore, R.C. (ed.) 1960. Treatise on Invertebrate Paleontology. Part I. Mollusca 1. Boulder, Colorado & Lawrence, Kansas : Geological Society of America & University of Kansas Press xxiii + 351 pp.

 
Skeneidae
Gastropod genera